Frank J. Veith is an American vascular surgeon who serves as Professor of Surgery, New York University Medical Center NY, NY  and Professor of Surgery Cleveland Clinic Lerner College of Medicine of Case Western Reserve University, Cleveland, OH. He was the first vascular surgeon in the United States to perform minimally invasive aortic aneurysm surgery (stent graft procedure) together with Drs. Michael L. Marin, Juan C. Parodi and Claudio J. Schonholz.

Education
Veith graduated from Cornell University Medical School 1955, completed his residency at Peter Bent Brigham Hospital, Harvard Medical School 1956–63 and served as Captain, U.S. Army Medical Corps and Chief, Surgical Service, U.S. Army Hospital, Fort Carlson, Colorado 1960–62.

Career

Frank J. Veith, M.D., is Professor of Surgery, at New York University Medical Center NY, NY and Professor of Surgery, Cleveland Clinic Lerner College of Medicine of Case Western Reserve University, Cleveland, OH.  Additionally, Dr. Veith occupies The William J. von Liebig Chair in Vascular Surgery at the Cleveland Clinic Foundation. Dr. Veith graduated from Cornell University Medical School 1955, completed his residency at Peter Bent Brigham Hospital, Harvard Medical School 1956–63 and served as Captain, U.S. Army Medical Corps and Chief, Surgical Service, U.S. Army Hospital, Fort Carlson, Colorado 1960–62.

Veith has authored or coauthored more than 1,000 original articles and chapters in medical journals, particularly on limb-salvage surgery and more recently the field of endovascular grafting for traumatic, aneurysmal and occlusive arterial disease.

Memberships and fellowships
Veith is a Fellow of the American College of Surgeons and in the past had served as chairman of the American Board of Vascular Surgery, president of the regional Eastern and New York Vascular Societies, and served as the 50th president of The Society for Vascular Surgery.

References

1931 births
Living people
American medical academics
American vascular surgeons
Fellows of the American College of Surgeons
Place of birth missing (living people)